Nenjam Marappathillai is a 2021 Indian Tamil-language horror film written and directed by Selvaraghavan. Jointly produced by Escape Artists Motion Pictures and GLO Studios, the film stars S. J. Suryah, Nandita Swetha and Regina Cassandra. Yuvan Shankar Raja composed the film score and soundtrack, with cinematography and editing were handled respectively by Arvind Krishna and Prasanna GK.

Nenjam Marappathillai began production in January 2016 and was completed in June 2016, but remained unreleased for several years, because of various consecutive issues, the first of which was the introduction of the Goods and Services Tax. After a long period of delays, it was released on 5 March 2021 and received mixed to positive reviews from critics with praise for the performances, originality and soundtrack but criticized the climax and predictability. The film was a box office success

Plot 
Mariam is a selfless orphan raised in a Christian orphanage by nuns. She gets an offer to look after a child in an affluent household in a small village and accepts the offer, so that she can contribute her share of money to the orphanage's betterment. She reaches the household and finds a little boy Rishi and his wealthy parents Ramsay and Swetha. Ramsay, formerly Ramasamy, was an orphan who started working in the cotton mill of his current father-in-law. He had risen step by step, often through nefarious means and finally made Swetha, the only heir of the billionaire fall in love with him using drugs. He married Swetha and currently manages the new cotton mill, albeit his father-in-law still having strict control of the business.

Rishi takes instant liking to Mariam and her tenderness with the boy contrasts with the coldness she receives from Ramsay and his wife. Along with them live four male servants including a security guard and the personal assistant/cook. Though uncomfortable in the beginning, Mariam learns to live there due to her financial commitments to the orphanage. Ramsay is smitten by Mariam's beauty and lusts after her. He tries to misbehave with her on multiple occasions and Mariam's attempts to complain to Swetha about this goes in vain.

One night, Ramsay cleverly plots a scheme and sends Swetha out of town for a board meeting and sexually assaults Mariam along with the male servants. He asks them to kill Mariam and dispose off her body. Soon, Mariam realises that she has come back to the household as a spirit and starts haunting them. Rishi is able to see her and numerous paranormal activities start happening in the household simultaneously. Out of fear, one of the male servant accidentally blurts out the truth about the murder to Swetha, who is filled with rage at Ramsay, but asks everyone to dispose of the evidences, burn Mariam's buried body and keep the incident a secret. As they proceed to do so, each of the servants is killed one after the other by Mariam.

Left with no option, Swetha herself exhumes and successfully burns Mariam's body. Mariam's spirit is destroyed and reaches god. God possesses Swetha instead and kills the cook, who was the last of the servants left and proceeds towards Ramsay and both brutally fight. "Swetha" submerges Ramsay and leaves. Seemingly unaffected, Ramsay returns to the house to see "Swetha" and Rishi happily reunited. He runs into "Swetha", only to realise that he is dead and has become a ghost.

Cast

Production

Development 
In December 2015, IANS reported that Gautham Vasudev Menon would be collaborating with Selvaraghavan to produce a horror film under his production house Ondraga Entertainment. Composer Santhosh Narayanan was signed on, marking his maiden collaboration with Selvaraghavan. Selvaraghavan's regular collaborator Arvind Krishna joined as the cinematographer, while editor Prasanna GK and art director Vijay Adhinathan were also included. Santhosh was eventually replaced by Yuvan Shankar Raja in April 2016, thus collaborating after a long time with Selvaraghavan.

In a 2016 interview with the magazine Ritz, in response to speculation that the film was either a "horror-comedy", a "straight horror film" or a "psycho-comedy", Selvaraghavan refused to confirm or deny what the genre was, but said he sought to invent a new one. However, in a 2021 interview with The Times of India, he said he had neither seen a horror film nor read a horror novel in his life, but his brother Dhanush was a fan of the genre; so Selvaraghavan decided to make a horror film without having seen any, laying the foundation for the film that would later be titled Nenjam Marappathillai. Another motive for making the film was to experiment with a genre he had not tried before.

Casting 
In December 2015, S. J. Suryah was announced as the lead actor. A month later, Regina Cassandra and Nandita Swetha were announced as the lead actresses. According to Selvaraghavan, all three actors were his first choices for their respective roles. He said he cast Suryah to compensate for a project he cast him in but swiftly dropped. During the auditions, Selvaraghavan spoke to Suryah for five minutes, Regina for five minutes and Nandita for two minutes.

Filming 
The film was launched after a simple muhurta ceremony held at Menon's office in Thiruvanmiyur, Chennai in January 2016, with the title of the film announced as Nenjam Marappathillai. It was also reported that the film is based on an original story and not a remake of the 1963 film of the same name. Selvaraghavan said he did not title the film after the 1963 film, but because he believed he would never forget Yuvan. The film was initially planned to be shot within a single schedule, which was to be completed in March 2016, however principal photography wrapped on 30 June 2016.

Soundtrack 
Yuvan Shankar Raja decided to reunite with Selvaraghavan for a film titled Kaan, but as the project was eventually shelved, Selvaraghavan decided to choose Yuvan to score the soundtrack for Nenjam Marappathillai. The film marks Selvaraghavan's reunion with Yuvan after a hiatus of 8 years since they worked together on their last project Yaaradi Nee Mohini (2008). The planned audio launch for the film was cancelled, and the soundtrack album directly released through the stores on 30 November 2016. The album features four songs with lyrics written by Selvaraghavan himself. The song "En Pondati Oorukku Poita" is titled after a line spoken by Janagaraj's character in Agni Natchathiram (1988).

The soundtrack opened to positive reviews from critics. Behindwoods gave 3 out of 5 to the album and stated it as a "good experiment from Yuvan!" IndiaGlitz gave 3.25 out of 5 and stated "Yuvan nails it again!" Sify gave 3.25 out of 5 to the album stating it as a "Powerhouse Soundtrack from Yuvan-Selva!" Karthik Srinivasan from Milliblog noted it as "a wonderfully quirky soundtrack". Moviecrow gave 3.25 out of 5 stating "The short and stupendous album matches up to the expectations from the Yuvan-Selva duo."

Marketing 
The first look poster was released in July 2016. Behindwoods noted that the poster had many similarities to that of Selvaraghavan's shelved film Doctors (not to be confused with Doctor), including the lead character's sitting posture and choice of clothes, believing Nenjam Marappathillai was Doctors revived with a new title.

Release 
Nenjam Marappathillai was initially scheduled to release on the occasion of Maha Shivaratri, 24 February 2017, but no official confirmation came from the team. It was later scheduled for a release on 30 June 2017, but was postponed indefinitely due to the introduction of Goods and Services Tax by the Central Government. Also Tamil Nadu state government had not clarified on the application of entertainment tax. While co-producer Siddharth Rao blamed Gautham Menon for the delay in the film's release, Menon released a press statement in March 2018 saying that he was in no way involved with the film "but for listening to the idea and pointing out the script and the film to escape artiste Madan. I'm not producer, neither am I a shareholder. Madan wanted my name on the posters and the film but I'm not on it anymore. It was my initiative, that's all it was and that didn't deserve a name on the poster."

More than a year later, in December 2019, Yuvan Shankar Raja said the film would be releasing soon and unveiled a new poster, although no release date was announced. In December 2020, the makers prompted for a digital release, with the makers held discussions with leading OTT platforms to distribute the film, the following month. On 8 February 2021, it was announced by the makers that the film will release in theatres on 5 March 2021, with Rockfort Entertainment distributing the film. Two days later, Suryah announced that the legal issue had been resolved, and the film released as scheduled. It began streaming on ZEE5 from 14 May 2021 onwards.

Reception 
The film received mixed to positive reviews; while the climax and predictability were criticised, the performances, soundtrack and originality received praise. Baradwaj Rangan wrote, "Nenjam Marappathillai is far from perfect, but scene for scene, it's a thrilling portal into the mind of Selvaraghavan." He concluded, "Nenjam Marappathillai—propelled by a grand Yuvan Shankar Raja score that matches the director's intensity and eccentricity—is the best thing Selvaraghavan has made in ages. Maybe breathing fresh life into stale genre premises is really his thing." Haricharan Pudipeddi of Hindustan Times wrote, "What's refreshing about Nenjam Marappathillai is that it is devoid of all the usual stereotypes one could associate with horror movies. We don't get the usual creaking doors and close up of the ghost on a character's face. We still get some predictable moments but the way Selva treats them make for an engaging watch."

Sify praised the performances of the lead cast, but criticised the film's second half and visual effects near the climax. M. Suganth of The Times of India rated the film 3 out of 5 and called it "a minor return to form for Selvaraghavan, who smartly uses his loud filmmaking style to give us a film that is over the top in a good way." Manoj Kumar R of The Indian Express also rated it 3 stars out of 5, saying, "Nenjam Marappathillai is what a director might find when he goes to the shooting with a vow to not follow the script. Instead, he rolls up his sleeves, and goes to work with his crew, determined to create something more wonderful, and tangible than what his mind imagined in the writer's room."

Controversy 
While promoting the film in an interview with Baradwaj Rangan, Selvaraghavan was asked whether the character of Ramasamy was based on Periyar, whose real name was E. V. Ramasamy. After a long pause, he replied "Yes". This caused controversy among followers of Periyar as they felt Selvaraghavan was defaming their idol. Selvaraghavan later apologised, saying he acted without properly comprehending the question asked.

Notes

References

External links 
 

2020s Tamil-language films
2021 horror films
Films directed by Selvaraghavan
Films postponed due to the COVID-19 pandemic
Films scored by Yuvan Shankar Raja
Indian horror films
Indian rape and revenge films